"Happenin' All Over Again" is a song written and produced by Stock Aitken & Waterman for American singer Lonnie Gordon's first album, If I Have to Stand Alone (1990). It was released as the album's second single on January 15, 1990, and reached  4 on the UK Singles Chart. The song mixed Stock Aitken & Waterman's Europop sound with the blooming Italo house music which was becoming big in the UK charts at the time. This 1990 version was never released in the US.

The song had been originally written for Donna Summer, but due to a falling-out with the producers, she never recorded it. Instead, it was given to Gordon. The Stock, Aitken & Waterman version was mixed by Phil Harding.

A different version of the song was included on Gordon's 1993 album Bad Mood. This version was released as a US single in 1993 and peaked at No. 98 on the Billboard Hot 100 chart, and also hit No. 1 on the Billboard Dance chart. In 1998, Gordon recorded the song for a second time and released it as a single.

Critical reception
Larry Flick from Billboard complimented the song, noting that Gordon's "fierce, sweet'n'sour performance is diva-supreme." David Giles from Music Week called it an "outstanding pop/disco record", adding that "it betrays a healthy obsession with Seventies dance music right down to the very "showbizzy" chord changes." The magazine also said it's "one of the year's finest songs" and put it at number 6 in their Top 10 list, "Pick of the Year - Mainstream Singles". William Shaw from Smash Hits wrote that "it's one of those unstoppable thumping rhythms with a gloriously loud tune belted out over the top by the formidable Ms Gordon." He added that "this is the absolute stuff."

Impact and legacy
British magazine Classic Pop ranked it number 22 in their list of "Top 40 Stock Aitken Waterman songs" in 2021. They wrote, "On a song originally intended for Donna Summer, phasing arpeggios were the order of the day in the PWL studio for Happenin’ All Over Again, soon to become the sophomore single from Lonnie Gordon’s debut album If I Have to Stand Alone. Mixed by Phil Harding, those Italo house influences are evident amongst the Euro dance-pop aura, leading to a well-earned Top 5 UK hit. Later on, in 1998, Coronation Streets Tracy Shaw had a crack at it and clawed her way to No.46 (best forgotten)."

Music video
A music video was produced to promote the single. It was later published on PWL's official YouTube channel in December 2016. The video has amassed more than 782,000 views as of September 2021.

Track listings
 CD single
 "Happenin' All Over Again" (hip house mix)
 "Happenin' All Over Again" (Italiano house mix)
 "Happenin' All Over Again" (senza voce)

 CD single (Belgium)
 "Happenin' All Over Again" (hip house radio mix) — 3:20
 "Happenin' All Over Again" (hip house mix) - 5:36
 "Happenin' All Over Again" (Italiano house mix) - 6:45
 "Right Before My Eyes"  (The blind house mix) - 6:12

 12-inch single
 "Happenin' All Over Again" (hip house mix)
 "Happenin' All Over Again" (Italiano house mix)
 "Right Before My Eyes" (The blind house mix)

 7-inch single
 "Happenin' All Over Again" (hip house radio mix) — 3:20
 "Happenin' All Over Again" (senza voce) — 3:36

 CD single  (1993 US remix)
 "Happenin' All Over Again" (LP version) 3:30
 "Happenin' All Over Again" (Tony king's hip hop mix) 5:30
 "Happenin' All Over Again" (Jewels & stone club mix) 6:20
 "Happenin' All Over Again" (Jumpin' johnny jay's r&b mix) 5:22
 "Happenin' All Over Again" (Pwl's original mix - extended version) 5:55

Charts

Original version

1993 remix

Young Divas version

Australian girl group Young Divas covered "Happenin' All Over Again" for their self-titled debut album Young Divas. It was produced by George Papapetros and Max Kourilov, and released as the second single from the album on November 11, 2006. The song peaked at number nine on the ARIA Singles Chart and was certified gold by the Australian Recording Industry Association (ARIA), for shipments of 35,000 copies. The music video for "Happenin' All Over Again" features the Young Divas singing and dancing in front of a white backdrop.

Track listing
CD single
 "Happenin' All Over Again"
 "Happenin' All Over Again" (Extended Remix)
 "This Time I Know It's for Real" (Music Video)

Credits and personnel
 Songwriting – Matt Aitken, Mike Stock, Pete Waterman
 Production - George Papapetros, Max Kourilov 
 Mixing – George Papapetros, Max Kourilov 
 Mastering – Tom Coyne

Charts

Weekly chart

Year-end charts

Certifications

Other covers
In mid-1998, former Coronation Street star Tracy Shaw released a cover version of "Happenin' All Over Again" that reached number 46 on the UK Singles Chart. Her character Maxine Heavey also sang it in the Coronation Street special "Viva Las Vegas".

References

1989 songs
1990 singles
1993 singles
2006 singles
Lonnie Gordon songs
Young Divas songs
Eurodance songs
Songs written by Pete Waterman
Songs written by Matt Aitken
Songs written by Mike Stock (musician)
Song recordings produced by Stock Aitken Waterman
SBK Records singles
Sony Music Australia singles